George Lawrence Thorogood (born February 24, 1950) is an American musician, singer and songwriter from Wilmington, Delaware. His "high-energy boogie-blues" sound became a staple of 1980s rock radio, with hits like his original songs "Bad to the Bone" and "I Drink Alone". He has also helped to popularize older songs by American icons, such as "Move It on Over", "Who Do You Love?", and "House Rent Blues/One Bourbon, One Scotch, One Beer".

With his band, the Delaware Destroyers (often known simply as "The Destroyers"), Thorogood has released over 20 albums, two of which have been certified Platinum and six have been certified Gold. He has sold 15 million records worldwide. Thorogood and his band continue to tour extensively and in 2014 the band celebrated their 40th anniversary of performing.

Music career
Thorogood began his career as a solo acoustic performer in the style of Robert Johnson and Elmore James after being inspired in 1970 by a John P. Hammond concert. In 1973, he formed a band, the Delaware Destroyers, with high school friend and drummer Jeff Simon. With additional players, the Delaware Destroyers developed its sound, a mixture of Chicago blues and rock and roll. The band's first shows were in the Rathskeller bar at the University of Delaware and at Deer Park Tavern, both in Newark, Delaware. Eventually, the band's name was shortened to the Destroyers. During this time, Thorogood supplemented his income by working as a roadie for Hound Dog Taylor.

Thorogood's demo Better Than the Rest was recorded in 1974, but was not released until 1979. His major recording debut came with the album George Thorogood and the Destroyers, which was released in 1977. In 1978, Thorogood released his next album with the Destroyers titled Move It on Over, which included a remake of Hank Williams's "Move It on Over". He followed those recordings in 1979 with "Please Set a Date" and a reworking of the Bo Diddley song "Who Do You Love", both released in 1979. The band's early success contributed to the rise of folk label Rounder Records.

During the late 1970s, Thorogood and his band were based in Boston. He was friends with Jimmy Thackery of the Washington, D.C.-based blues band, The Nighthawks. While touring in the 1970s, the Destroyers and the Nighthawks were playing shows in Georgetown at venues across the street from each other. The Destroyers were engaged at the Cellar Door and the Nighthawks at Desperados. At midnight, while both bands played Elmore James's "Madison Blues" in the same key, Thorogood and Thackery left their clubs, met in the middle of M Street, exchanged guitar patch cords and went on to play with the opposite band in the other club. The connection with the Nighthawks was extended further when Nighthawks bass player Jan Zukowski supported Thorogood's set with Bo Diddley and Albert Collins at the Live Aid concert in Philadelphia, PA, on July 13, 1985.

Thorogood gained his first mainstream exposure as a support act for the Rolling Stones during their 1981 U.S. tour. He was also the featured musical guest on Saturday Night Live (Season 8, Episode 2) on the October 2, 1982, broadcast. During this time, Thorogood and the Destroyers became known for their rigorous touring schedule, including the "50/50" tour in 1981, on which the band toured all 50 US states in 50 days. After two shows in Boulder, Colorado, Thorogood and his band flew to Hawaii for one show and then performed a show in Alaska the following night. The next day, Thorogood and his band met his roadies in Washington and continued the one-show-per-state tour. In addition, he played Washington, D.C. on the same day that he performed a show in Maryland, thereby playing 51 shows in 50 days.

With his contract with Rounder Records expiring, Thorogood signed with EMI America Records and, in 1982, released the single "Bad to the Bone" and an album of the same name that went gold. The song became the band's most well-known song through appearances on MTV and use in films, television and commercials. Thorogood and his band went on to have two more gold studio albums in the 1980s, Maverick and Born to Be Bad. The former features Thorogood's only Billboard Hot 100 hit, a remake of Johnny Otis's "Willie and the Hand Jive", and his concert staple "I Drink Alone".

Thorogood's popularity waned in the 1990s, although he had a No. 2 hit on the Billboard Album Rock Tracks chart in 1992 with "Get a Haircut".

In 2012, Thorogood was named one of the "50 Most Influential Delawareans of the Past 50 Years". He released his first proper solo album in 2017 titled Party of One.

On March 14, 2020, Thorogood was inducted into the Mississippi Music Project Hall of Fame in Biloxi, Mississippi and was awarded the MMP Music Award for his lifelong commitment to the music industry.

Band members

The Destroyers
George Thorogood – lead vocals, lead guitar, slide guitar, rhythm guitar (1973–present)
Jeff Simon – drums, percussion (1973–present)
Billy Blough – bass guitar (1976–present)
Jim Suhler – rhythm guitar and lead guitar (1999–present)
Buddy Leach – saxophone, piano (2003–present)

Former members
Michael Levine – bass (1973–1976)
Ron "Roadblock" Smith – rhythm guitar (1974–1980)
Hank "Hurricane" Carter – saxophone (1980–2003)
Ian Stewart – keyboards (1982)
Steve Chrismar – rhythm guitar (1985–1993)
Waddy Wachtel – guitar (1997)

Timeline

Discography

Studio albums with the Destroyers 
1977: George Thorogood and the Destroyers 
1978: Move It on Over 
1979: Better Than the Rest (Recorded in 1974)
1980: More George Thorogood and the Destroyers
1982: Bad to the Bone 
1985: Maverick 
1988: Born to Be Bad 
1991: Boogie People
1993: Haircut
1997: Rockin' My Life Away
1999: Half a Boy/Half a Man
2003: Ride 'Til I Die
2006: The Hard Stuff
2009: The Dirty Dozen
2011: 2120 South Michigan Ave.

Solo studio album 
2017: Party of One

Personal life
Thorogood has been a baseball fan for most of his life, playing semi-pro ball as a second baseman during the 1970s (drummer Jeff Simon played center field on the same team).  He took his daughter to Chicago for her first major league game (Cubs vs. Rockies), during which he sang "Take Me Out to the Ball Game". In a 2011 Guitar World interview, he stated "I'm a Mets fan. There aren't many of us but you know, that's me."

References

External links

George Thorogood and the Destroyers official website
Review: The Hard Stuff

1950 births
Living people
Lead guitarists
American blues guitarists
American male guitarists
American blues harmonica players
American blues singers
American rock guitarists
American rock singers
Musicians from Wilmington, Delaware
Slide guitarists
Blues rock musicians
University of Delaware alumni
Semi-professional baseball players
EMI Records artists
Rounder Records artists
MCA Records artists
Attic Records (Canada) artists
20th-century American singers
21st-century American singers
20th-century American guitarists
21st-century American guitarists
Singers from Delaware
Guitarists from Delaware
20th-century American male singers
21st-century American male singers